Yongsan International School of Seoul (YISS) is a kindergarten (age 5) to 12th grade college-preparatory private international school, operated under a joint agreement between the Korea Foreign Schools Foundation and the Network of International Christian Schools. It is accredited by WASC and ACSI. The school offers both secular and faith-based instructional tracks drawn from the American and standards-based instructional models, as well as a variety of Advanced Placement (AP) courses at the high school level. YISS graduates regularly gain admission to many highly selective schools; graduates have attended Stanford, MIT, Columbia, University of Pennsylvania, Cornell, Duke, West Point, NYU Stern, Northwestern, UC Berkeley, University College London, and University of St. Andrews (UK).

The student body of 1,000 students represents more than 50 countries.

School

Location
YISS is located in Itaewon, Yongsan-gu. The school is built on 23,100 square meters of land leased from the [Seoul Metropolitan Government] in 2005 for 50 years at a value of 50 billion won (US$50 million). The Ministry of Trade, Industry and Energy provided funding of 13 billion won (US$13 million) for construction costs and the Korea Chamber of Commerce & Industry (KCCI) financed additional costs of 20 billion won (US$20 million).

Academics
In 2018, the SAT scores of the 12th grade students was 1,460 (U.S. national average was 1,068). In 2018, the average ACT Score of the 12th grade students was 30.5 (U.S. national average was 21). YISS offers 26 Advanced Placement (AP) Courses. Half of the high school students were enrolled in at least 1 AP course in 2018 with 93% of the students scoring 3+ and 51% of the students scoring a 5.

Colleges and Universities
Students have been admitted to global educational institutions including Harvard University, Dartmouth College, Brown University, Princeton University, University of Pennsylvania, Yale University, Cornell University, Columbia University, University of Chicago, Stanford University, Carnegie Mellon University, Pepperdine University, University of Toronto (Canada), University of York (UK), University of Queensland (Australia), Goethe University (Germany), S P Jain School of Global Management (Singapore), Seoul National University (Korea), Korea University (Korea), and Yonsei University (Korea).

Facilities
During the summer of 2017, the Korean Foreign Schools Foundation (KFSF) initiated and funded a major renovation of the entrance to YISS. The new additions include a new gate, trellises, sidewalks, a pedestrian staircase, terraced seating, landscaping, and a large metallic mosaic facade. During the summer of 2021 the kindergarten classrooms were extensively renovated to facilitate play-based learning, and a new kindergarten playground area was installed.

Extracurricular Activities

Sports
YISS competes with international and Department of Defense (DoDDS) schools as a member of the Korean American Interscholastic Activities Conference (KAIAC) in the Blue Division. For international competition, YISS is part of the Asia Christian Schools Conference (ACSC), which includes schools from Guam, Hong Kong, Malaysia, Philippines, Taiwan, and Thailand.

High School Fall Sports (August-October):
 Cross Country (Varsity Boys, JV Boys, Varsity Girls, JV Girls) 
 Tennis (Varsity Boys, Varsity Girls) 
 Volleyball (Varsity Boys, Varsity Girls, JV Girls) 
 ACSC Swim Championships 
 ACSC Boys Soccer Tournament
High School Winter Sports (November-February):
 Basketball (Varsity Boys, JV Boys, Varsity Girls, JV Girls) 
 Cheerleading (Varsity Girls)
High School Spring Sports (February-May):
 Soccer (Varsity Boys, Varsity Girls) 
 Swimming (Varsity Boys, Varsity Girls)
 Track and Field (Varsity Boys, Varsity Girls) 
Middle School Quarter 1 Sports (August-October):
 Cross Country
 Soccer 
Middle School Quarter 2 Sport (October-December):
 Swimming
Middle School Quarter 3 Sport (January-March):
 Volleyball
Middle School Quarter 4 Sports (March-May):
 Basketball
 Tennis

YISS GOES & Immersion
The Guardians Outreach Education & Service (GOES) program (formerly known as Guardians with a Message (GWAM)) provides high school students with opportunities to serve and learn in Korea and throughout Asia during Spring Break. About half of the high school student body participates.

Immersion is a program created with middle schoolers in mind. There are three foundational pieces of this program: spiritual growth and development, community service, and cultural immersion.

GOES and Immersion trips send students to places such as Manila, Baguio, Bangkok, Hong Kong, Shanghai, Yanji, Gunsan, and Taebaek.

Others
Students participate in Model United Nation events such as BEIMUN and SEOMUN. They also participate in the Chess Tournament.

Controversy
There has been some controversy as to how students are admitted, particularly those of Korean ethnicity. In 2008 the school was accused of admitting unqualified students who were children of Korean staff within the schools.

.

See also
 Namsan (Seoul)

References

External links
 Official website
 Official KAIAC website

Schools in South Korea
Educational institutions established in 1990
American international schools in South Korea
Christian schools in South Korea
International schools in Seoul
International schools in South Korea
1990 establishments in South Korea
Yongsan District